Piece by Piece may refer to:
 Piece by Piece (book), an autobiography by Tori Amos
 Piece by Piece (film), a 2004 documentary film

Music
 Piece by Piece (Kelly Clarkson album), 2015
 "Piece by Piece" (song), title track from the above album
 Piece by Piece Remixed, a companion remix album
 Piece by Piece (Katie Melua album)
 Piece by Piece (John Martyn album)
 "Piece by Piece", a 2001 song by Feeder from the rock album Echo Park
 "Piece by Piece", a 1985 song by The Tubes rock album Love Bomb
 "Piece by Piece", a 1986 song by the metal band Slayer on the album Reign in Blood